The 1980 Chicago Cubs season was the 109th season of the Chicago Cubs franchise, the 105th in the National League and the 65th at Wrigley Field. The Cubs finished sixth and last in the National League East with a record of 64–98.

Offseason 
 October 3, 1979: Ken Holtzman was released by the Cubs.
 October 17, 1979: Donnie Moore was traded by the Cubs to the St. Louis Cardinals for Mike Tyson.
 January 11, 1980: 1980 Major League Baseball draft
Jim Eppard was drafted by the Cubs in the 11th round, but did not sign.
Tom Henke was drafted by the Cubs in the 1st round (24th pick) of the secondary phase, but did not sign.
 February 5, 1980: Derek Botelho was released by the Cubs.

Regular season

Season standings

Record vs. opponents

Notable transactions 
 June 3, 1980: Don Schulze was drafted in the 1st round (11th pick) of the 1980 Major League Baseball draft.
 June 7, 1980: Henry Cotto was signed as an amateur free agent by the Cubs.
 July 14, 1980: Rolando Roomes was signed as an amateur free agent by the Cubs.

Roster

Player stats

Batting

Starters by position 
Note: Pos = Position; G = Games played; AB = At bats; H = Hits; Avg. = Batting average; HR = Home runs; RBI = Runs batted in

Other batters 
Note: G = Games played; AB = At bats; H = Hits; Avg. = Batting average; HR = Home runs; RBI = Runs batted in

Pitching

Starting pitchers 
Note: G = Games pitched; IP = Innings pitched; W = Wins; L = Losses; ERA = Earned run average; SO = Strikeouts

Other pitchers 
Note: G = Games pitched; IP = Innings pitched; W = Wins; L = Losses; ERA = Earned run average; SO = Strikeouts

Relief pitchers 
Note: G = Games pitched; W = Wins; L = Losses; SV = Saves; ERA = Earned run average; SO = Strikeouts

Farm system

Notes

References 

1980 Chicago Cubs season at Baseball Reference

Chicago Cubs seasons
Chicago Cubs season
Chicago